Chandrakant Ramakant Navghare commonly known as Rajubhaiya Navghare, is a member of the 13th Maharashtra Legislative Assembly. He represents Basmath (Vidhan Sabha constituency). He got elected in 2019 Maharashtra Legislative Assembly election. Navghare is from Nationalist Congress Party. Rajubhaiya Navghare was first elected as a Member of the gram panchayat, then he was sarpanch from Babhulgaon. Rajubhaiya was also elected two times as agriculture produce market Committee Chairman, Director Rokdeshwar Cooperative Textile mill and Director of Purna cooperative Sugar factory.

See also

 Panditrao Ramrao Deshmukh
 Manohar Joshi ministry
 Narayan Rane
.

References

Living people
Members of the Maharashtra Legislative Assembly
Marathi politicians
1981 births
Nationalist Congress Party politicians from Maharashtra